The 9 municipalities of the South Karelia Region in Finland are divided on two sub-regions: 



Imatra sub-region 
Imatra
Parikkala
Rautjärvi
Ruokolahti (Ruokolax)

Lappeenranta sub-region 
Lappeenranta (Villmanstrand)
Lemi
Luumäki
Savitaipale
Taipalsaari

See also 
Southern Finland
Regions of Southern Finland

External links